The Robinson Armament Co. XCR is a multi-caliber, gas piston weapon system developed by Robinson Armament Co. for U.S. Special Operations Command (SOCOM) to satisfy the requirements of the SOF Combat Assault Rifle, or SCAR competition, but was disqualified on a technicality due to late delivery of blank firing adapters. Robinson Armament continued development and the XCR is now being offered to law enforcement, the military and general public. Deliveries of the rifle began in mid-2006. The XCR was displayed to U.S. Army officials during an invitation-only Industry Day on November 13, 2008. The goal of the Industry Day was to review current carbine technology prior to writing formal requirements for a future replacement for the M4 Carbine.

Overview
The XCR utilizes a heavy duty bolt and extractor connected to a long stroke type gas piston. The bolt and extractor are designed and patented by Robinson Arms, and promoted as offering higher performance over eight lug M16/M4 type bolts. Other features include a folding stock which eases storage space consumption and deploying from a vehicle, in addition to telescoping M4 Carbine style stocks for those who prefer length of pull adjustments; it also has a monolithic top Picatinny rail with side and under-barrel rails, and forward assist integrated into left-side charging handle.

Operating mechanism

The XCR employs a Kalashnikov type, gas operated action with the bolt carrier attached to a long-stroke gas piston; the gas chamber is located above the barrel.

The proprietary bolt is a three-lug design that locks onto the barrel extension leaving the upper receiver unstressed. There is no need to check the headspace when changing barrels. A steel fixed ejector is attached to the inside of the receiver, held in place by two bolts. The manufacturer claims this design provides stronger ejection than what is offered on the AR-15's spring-loaded ejector design. The ejection pattern is to the two o'clock position of the operator, with an optimum distance of 15 ft to 20 ft depending on ammunition type and gas setting.

Magazines are STANAG 4179 type.

History and variants
The XCR was designed in 2004 by Alex J. Robinson of Robinson Armament Co. Production of the XCR-L variant of the rifle began in mid-2006.

The XCR-L is currently available in 5.56×45mm NATO, 6.8mm Remington SPC and 7.62×39mm calibers. Each of these calibers is available in kit form for converting an existing rifle to one of the other calibers.

The XCR-M .308 was officially confirmed via Robinson Arms email circulation to a public reveal at SHOT show 2011.
The 6.8mm Remington SPC variant began shipping in November 2007.

The 7.62×39mm rifles and conversion kits began shipping in July 2008.

In August 2009 Robinson Arms began shipping 3 different sized upper receivers enabling PDW and pistol style variants:
 Standard Upper Receiver – The original length and designed to support barrel lengths from 11" to 18.6".
 Mini Upper Receivers – 15.25" long and designed to support barrel lengths from 9" to 18.6". Primarily intended for barrel lengths from 9" to 10".
 Micro Upper Receivers – 13.25" long and designed to support barrel lengths from 7.5" to 18.6". Primarily intended for barrel lengths from 7.5" to 8".

Variants are also available in "California" versions which are limited to meet the more restrictive State of California firearms laws.

Robinson Armament also produced an 18.6" barrel version for the Canadian market. The XCR rifles intended for the Canadian market were shipped with the FAST stock (fully adjustable stock), although aftermarket stocks are available as an accessory. These rifles shipped with a single magazine pinned to accept only five rounds. On May 1, 2020, the XCR was reclassified as a Prohibited Firearm and is no longer legal to import or sell in Canada.

Since its introduction in 2006, components of the XCR have been updated. Most of these enhancements are available to existing XCR owners.

 In November 2006 the firing pin was redesigned and made more durable and robust.
 The first few hundred XCRs shipped with Yankee Hill Machine (YHM) back up iron sights (BUIS). The most recent iteration ships either without BUIS or with BUIS designed by Midwest Industries.
 A 2nd generation adjustable gas system started shipping with XCR rifles in July 2007. The 1st generation gas system required tools (a 5/8" wrench) to adjust. The 2nd generation system can be adjusted by hand.
 The XCR's hammer was updated in July 2008 concurrent with the release of the 7.62×39 rifles/kits. The new heavier design allows the XCR to ignite some newer Wolf 7.62×39 ammunition made with extra-hard primers.
 In early 2009, Robinson began shipping rifles with an integral winter-style trigger guard and new paddle style safety. A provision for a quick detachable sling loop was added to the stock mount.
 A two-stage match trigger is available which will break at approximately 3.5 lbs. This trigger can be ordered with a new rifle or retrofitted to an older one. The older one was a two-stage trigger that was about twice as heavy, and some complaints included trigger slap. As of May 2009, the new trigger has been shipping with all new rifles.
 Ambidextrous mag release was demonstrated at SHOT 2010 and is now available.
 XCR-M .308 and XCR-L 5.45 calibers have been confirmed for public announcement and display at SHOT show 2011 via Robinson e-mail bulletin.
 Aftermarket adapters are available to allow the use of the Bushmaster ACR stock on XCR rifles. The FAST stock the XCR comes with is not highly regarded by most end users, and is considered by many the only significant shortcoming of the platform aside from the barrel retention bolt.

See also
 List of firearms
 List of assault rifles
 List of battle rifles
 Beretta ARX 160
 CZ-805 BREN
 Robinson Armaments M96 Expeditionary
 USSOCOM
 FN SCAR
 Heckler & Koch HK416
 Adaptive Combat Rifle
 Heckler & Koch XM8
 M4 Carbine
 AK-12

References

External links
 Robinson Arm website
 Official Online Discussion Forum
 Modern Firearms Page
 Defense Review prototype overview
 XCR review, March 2007
 XCR review, April 2010

.300 BLK firearms
5.56 mm assault rifles
7.62×39mm assault rifles
7.62×51mm NATO firearms
5.45×39mm assault rifles
Weapons and ammunition introduced in 2006